Everett Augustus Carpenter (July 6, 1835 – August 5, 1899) was an American lawyer and politician.

Life
Carpenter was born on July 6, 1835 in Seekonk, Massachusetts. His father, Benoni Carpenter, was a Rhode Island Senator, Army Surgeon, and Rhode Island State Prison Superintendent.

Carpenter attended Brown University. He graduated from there in 1854, part of the last class taught by Francis Wayland. He then became a teacher, simultaneously studying law. When he reached the age of majority, he was admitted to the bar. At some point, he moved to Sag Harbor, New York and practiced law there. He served as Assistant United States Assessor for Suffolk County, Chairman of the Republican County Committee of Suffolk County, and President of the Board of Education. He was a member of the Stalwart faction.

In 1879, Carpenter was elected to the New York State Assembly as a Republican, representing Suffolk County. He served in the Assembly in 1880 and 1881.

Carpenter was a member of the Psi Upsilon fraternity. He was married to the daughter of Captain Barney Green of Southampton. They had two daughters, Maria Gleason and Addie.

Carpenter died at home from heart disease on August 5, 1899. He was buried in Oakland Cemetery in Sag Harbor.

References

External links 

 The Political Graveyard
 Everett A. Carpenter at Find a Grave

1835 births
1899 deaths
People from Seekonk, Massachusetts
Brown University alumni
People from Sag Harbor, New York
New York (state) lawyers
19th-century American lawyers
19th-century American politicians
Republican Party members of the New York State Assembly
Burials in New York (state)